Scott Farmer may refer to:

 Scott Farmer (businessman) (born 1959), chief executive officer of Cintas
 Scott Farmer (politician) (born 1962), councillor for Stirling (council area)